Fusing, as a joining process, may refer to:

Fusing (manufacturing), type of manufacturing process for joining or terminating electrical magnet wire
Stained glass fusing, technique used to join glass pieces together

Fusing as a place may refer to:
Fusing, Changhua, Taiwan
Fuxing District, Handan, district of Handan, Hebei, China
Fuxing District, Taoyuan, Taoyuan City, Taiwan

See also 
Fuse (disambiguation)
Fusion (disambiguation)